Causeway (historically anglicised as Kantogher) is a village in County Kerry in Ireland. In the village there is one shop/post office, two hairdressers, a fast food outlet, a funeral home, a bakery and four pubs. Other amenities in the area include a GAA pitch, health centre, church, primary school, and a secondary school.

Education
Causeway Comprehensive School is a co-educational school offering a complete second level education to pupils from Kerryhead to Lisselton and from Ardfert to Dromclough.

Geography

Causeway Parish is bordered to the south by Ardfert/Kilmoyley, to the west by Ballyheigue and to the northeast Ballyduff. To the north is the Shannon Estuary and the cliffs of Meenogahane.

History
"An Tóchar" is Irish for "(the) causeway". The village was founded on an ancient Celtic roadway which originated in the neighbouring parish of Ballyheigue and was reputed to have ended in Tara, seat of the High-Kings of Ireland.

Shannonside Local Radio operated from Causeway in 1987.

According to 2016 census figures, the population of Causeway was 257, a slight decrease from the 264 inhabitants recorded in the 2011 census.

See also
 List of towns and villages in Ireland

References

External links
Causeway GAA

Towns and villages in County Kerry